This is a list of UEFA Women's Cup and UEFA Women's Champions League winning football managers.  German manager Monika Staab led Frankfurt to success in the inaugural UEFA Women's Cup Final in 2002. German clubs and managers dominated the competition, winning seven of the tournaments since 2002.

The competition became the UEFA Women's Champions League in 2010, with German Bernd Schröder leading Turbine Potsdam to success that year. 
  
Six managers have won the title on two occasions: Bernd Schröder, Hans-Jürgen Tritschoks and Ralf Kellermann with German teams, Patrice Lair, Gérard Prêcheur, and Reynald Pedros with French club, Lyon.

By year

Managers with multiple titles

Bold = Still active as manager

By nationality
This table lists the total number of titles won by managers of each nationality.

References

External links
UEFA Women's Champions league official history

Managers
Uefa Women's Champions League